Arzanah Airport  is a small private airfield operated by the Zakum Development Company and serves the oil field at Arzanah, Abu Dhabi, UAE.

References

Airports in the United Arab Emirates